Phaulernis laserinella is a moth of the family Epermeniidae that is endemic to France.

References

Moths described in 2003
Epermeniidae
Moths of Europe
Endemic fauna of France